Desmia hadriana is a moth in the family Crambidae. It was described by Herbert Druce in 1895. It is found in Panama and the Mexican states of Veracruz and Tabasco.

References

Moths described in 1895
Desmia
Moths of Central America